Risoba diversipennis is a species of tuft moth native to the Himalayas, Indochina and to Papua New Guinea. It was described by Francis Walker in 1858. Recorded host plants are Melastoma.

Gallery

References

Moths of Asia
Nolidae
Moths described in 1858